Lorenzo Lucca (born 10 September 2000) is an Italian professional footballer who plays as a striker for Eredivisie club Ajax, on loan from Pisa. He also represents the Italy under-21 national team.

Club career

Early career 
Born in Moncalieri, Lucca began playing youth football as a kid for CBS Scuola Calcio, a local team in Turin, and then moved to the Torino FC youth academy at age eight. He later moved to Chieri, a club in the province of Turin, but was discarded and allowed to join Atletico Torino. With Atletico Torino, he made his senior debut at age 16 in the Italian sixth-tier (Promozione), scoring two goals. The following season Lucca was signed by Vicenza, with whom he made his professional debut in 2018 at the age of 17 during a Serie C league game against Sambenedettese.

Lucca was recalled by Torino in 2018 and loaned to Brescia. After scoring 16 goals in 18 games for the Brescia primavera youth side, he was called back at Torino in 2019 and played for the Toro primavera side for the first half of the 2019–20 season.

Palermo 
On 31 January 2020, Lucca left Torino to join Palermo in Serie D on a free transfer. He only played three games for the Rosanero as part of the 2019–20 Serie D season which ended in promotion to Serie C for the club, also due to the league halt following the COVID-19 outbreak in the country.

In July 2020, Lucca signed his first professional contract, penning a four-year deal with the Rosanero. For the 2020–21 Serie C season, Lucca started as a understudy to Andrea Saraniti, but soon broke into the first team and became the team topscorer by February, breaking the ten-goal threshold after scoring a brace against Turris.

Pisa 

On 21 July 2021, Lucca joined Serie B club Pisa, penning a five-year deal with the  Neroazzurri . He made his debut for Pisa against SPAL and scored his first two goals for the club 2–0 victory against Alessandria.
After bagging six goals in the first seven matches of the season, he stops scoring, marking his season tally at 6 goals in 34 Serie B matches.

Ajax 
On 5 August 2022, Eredivisie champions Ajax announced to have signed Lucca from Pisa, on a loan deal with an option to buy. He became the first Italian player in Ajax's history. He scored his first goal for the club on 6 November 2022, scoring against PSV Eindhoven in a 1-2 loss in the Eredivisie.

International career
On 7 September 2021, he made his debut with the Italy U21 squad, playing as a substitute in the qualifying match won 1–0 against Montenegro.

Career statistics

References

2000 births
Living people
People from Moncalieri
Sportspeople from the Metropolitan City of Turin
Italian footballers
Footballers from Piedmont
Association football forwards
L.R. Vicenza players
Palermo F.C. players
Pisa S.C. players
AFC Ajax players
Serie B players
Serie C players
Serie D players
Eredivisie players
Italian expatriate footballers
Italian expatriate sportspeople in the Netherlands
Expatriate footballers in the Netherlands